John Mayall is an English blues rock musician. Originally from Macclesfield, he began his career in 1963 when he moved to London and formed John Mayall & the Bluesbreakers. The band's original lineup included Mayall on vocals, keyboards and harmonica, guitarist Bernie Watson, bassist John McVie and drummer Peter Ward. After changing personnel numerous times, the group disbanded in 1968 when Mayall relocated to the United States and continued his career using his own name. The current lineup of Mayall's solo band includes bassist Greg Rzab, drummer Jay Davenport (both since 2009) and guitarist Carolyn Wonderland (since 2018).

History

1963–1968: The Bluesbreakers
Mayall formed the Bluesbreakers in February 1963. Early performers involved with the band included guitarists Sammy Prosser, Davey Graham and John Gilbey, bassists Ricky Brown and Pete Burford, and drummers Sam Stone, Brian Myall and Keith Robertson. The first official lineup of the group introduced in July included guitarist Bernie Watson, bassist John McVie and drummer Peter Ward.
Martin Hart replaced Ward shortly after the band's formation. Shortly before the release of their first single, Watson and Hart were replaced by Roger Dean and Hughie Flint, respectively. A year later, Dean was replaced by Eric Clapton, who debuted with the group on 9 April 1965. By September, the guitarist had abruptly left to form a new band and tour Greece. Several substitutes filled in for Clapton, including Geoff Krivit,
ending with Peter Green for around a week.
Clapton returned in November.
Meanwhile, McVie had been fired in October and replaced by Jack Bruce, who only stayed for around a month.

Clapton remained until 17 July 1966, after forming Cream the previous day, and was replaced again by Green. Flint left the band in September, with Aynsley Dunbar taking his place. The drummer left in April 1967, when he was replaced by Micky Waller and later by Mick Fleetwood. Fleetwood was fired after two months, with Green following him to form Fleetwood Mac. McVie initially hesitated to join the pair, but did so in September. Green was replaced by Mick Taylor and Terry Edmonds, the latter of whom left after only a few weeks. Fleetwood was replaced by Keef Hartley. At the same time, Mayall expanded the group with the addition of saxophonists Chris Mercer and Rip Kant, the latter of whom was replaced by Dick Heckstall-Smith in August. McVie was initially replaced for a month by Paul Williams, and later by Keith Tillman. The group added a seventh member in February 1968, as trumpeter Henry Lowther joined the band.

After the band's first American tour in early 1968, Tillman was replaced for around a month by Andy Fraser. When the bassist joined Free, he was replaced in the Bluesbreakers by Tony Reeves; at the same time, Hartley left and was replaced by Jon Hiseman. This lineup recorded Bare Wires, which was the last studio album to bear the Bluesbreakers name. Soon after the album's release, Reeves, Hiseman and Heckstall-Smith left Mayall's band to form Colosseum, a progressive jazz-rock group. Mercer and Lowther also left, as Mayall disbanded the Bluesbreakers after just a few weeks of touring for Bare Wires. Mayall would subsequently relocate from London to Laurel Canyon, Los Angeles, California in August to continue his career as a solo artist, with Taylor joining him.

1968–1981: Early solo career
Upon disbanding the Bluesbreakers and moving to the US, Mayall and Taylor recorded Blues from Laurel Canyon with bassist Steve Thompson and drummer Colin Allen. This lineup remained active for almost a year, until Taylor left to replace Brian Jones in The Rolling Stones on 5 June 1969. After the guitarist's departure, Mayall restructured his band to focus on more acoustic music; he replaced Taylor with Jon Mark, dropped Allen from the group, and added saxophonist Johnny Almond. Early the next year, he replaced Thompson with Alex Dmochowski and added Duster Bennett on harmonica. In August, Mark and Almond left to form the eponymous group Mark-Almond, and Mayall put together another lineup which included former Canned Heat members Harvey Mandel (guitar) and Larry Taylor (bass), as well as violinist Don "Sugarcane" Harris. From November 1970 to January 1971, Mayall recorded Back to the Roots with new drummer Paul Lagos and a range of former bandmates.

Following the release of Back to the Roots, Mayall downsized to a lineup of just him, bassist Taylor and new guitarist Jerry McGee, with their only effort Memories released before the end of the year. By the end of the year, the group had been restructured again to reflect a much more jazz-heavy direction, with Mayall enlisting guitarist Freddie Robinson, drummer Ron Selico, saxophonist Clifford Solomon and trumpeter Richard "Blue" Mitchell to record the live album Jazz Blues Fusion. Patrick "Putter" Smith was added as a second bassist in early 1972, before Victor Gaskin took over a few months later. Former drummer Hartley returned to replace Selico in June, The group briefly added three more saxophonists – Charles Owens, Fred Jackson and Ernie Watts – for the live album Moving On, before all four were replaced by James "Red" Holloway. This lineup released the album Ten Years Are Gone in September 1973, which marked Mayall's ten-year anniversary as a professional musician.

In early 1974, after recovering from a broken leg, Mayall restructured his band again for a planned European tour, retaining only Holloway and adding guitarist Jesse Ed Davis, returning bassist Larry Taylor and drummer Soko Richardson. Davis was soon replaced by Randy Resnick and Hightide Harris, however. After releasing The Latest Edition, the band's lineup changed again as Mayall, Taylor and Richardson added returning violinist Don "Sugarcane" Harris and new members Rick Vito on guitar, Jay Spell on keyboards and Dee McKinnie on vocals. In 1976, Mayall collaborated with a wide range of his former bandmates for a second time on A Banquet in Blues, released in August. After the album's release, he toured with Taylor, Spell, Holloway, guitarist Gary Rowles and drummer Frank Wilson, plus touring percussionist Warren Bryant, saxophonists Jimmy Roberts, Ann Patterson and David Majal Li, trumpeter Nolan Smith, trombonist Bill Lamb, and vocalists Pepper Watkins and Patti Smith.

Mayall downsized again in 1977, bringing back Thompson and Richardson, and adding guitarist James Quill Smith. This lineup released A Hard Core Package in 1977 and The Last of the British Blues in 1978. After releasing Bottom Line in 1979, an album recorded with various session musicians, Mayall reunited with Mandel, who brought his backing band with him: bassist Angus Thomas, drummer Ruben Alvarez and vocalist Maggie Parker. Mandel pulled out of the tour early on, however, and Smith returned. No More Interviews was released at the end of the year, which also featured former guitarist Vito, keyboardist Chris Cameron and saxophonist Chris Mostert. In 1980, Road Show Blues was recorded with returning drummer Richardson and new bassist Kevin McCormick, as well as Parker and Smith.

1981–2008: The band reforms
In December 1981, it was announced that John Mayall & the Bluesbreakers would reform for an Australian tour starting the following January, with the frontman joined by guitarist Mick Taylor, bassist John McVie and drummer Colin Allen. Hughie Flint filled in for Allen at four warm-up shows earlier in the month. The tour spawned the live video release Blues Alive, as well as several live tracks for the album Return of the Bluesbreakers. By June, McVie had been replaced by McCormick, who was then replaced by Thompson. In early 1984, Mayall and Taylor toured with bassist Tim Drummond and drummer Mike Gardner. Later in the year, Mayall introduced a new lineup of the Bluesbreakers, with Henry "Coco" Montoya and "Kal" David Raskin on guitars, Bobby Haynes on bass and Willie McNeil on drums, who recorded several tracks later released on the album Cross Country Blues. Raskin and McNeil were replaced early the following year by Walter Trout and Joe Yuele, respectively.

The lineup of Montoya, Trout, Haynes and Yuele remained stable for four years, recording two live albums and Mayall's first full studio effort in seven years, Chicago Line. In 1989, Trout left the Bluesbreakers to pursue a solo career, releasing his debut album before the end of the year. Rather than replace him, Mayall decided to reduce the band to a four-piece. In 1990, Haynes also left the group. Several tracks on 1990's A Sense of Place were recorded by Daniel "Freebo" Friedberg, who later also replaced Haynes on tour. Rick Cortes took over on bass before the end of the year. Following the release of Wake Up Call in 1993, Montoya left the band to pursue a solo career, with Buddy Whittington taking his place. Cortes left in 1996, with John Paulus taking his place in time to record 1997's Blues for the Lost Days.

Greg Rzab replaced Paulus for a European tour in 1999, but left again the following year to join The Black Crowes. Greg Boaz filled in for a tour in the summer of 2000, before Hank Van Sickle took over on a permanent basis in September. Along for the Ride, released in 2001, was credited to "John Mayall & Friends" and featured a wide range of contributors, including current band members, former members and other guest musicians. In early 2001, keyboardist Tom Canning – who had contributed to 1993's Wake Up Call as well as Along for the Ride – was added as an official member of the Bluesbreakers. In 2003, Mayall released the live album 70th Birthday Concert, recorded earlier in the year with guests including former members Eric Clapton, Mick Taylor and Henry Lowther.

2008 onwards: Later solo work
In November 2008, Mayall announced that he was retiring the Bluesbreakers name, and would return the following year with a new solo band. By January, he had revealed the members of his eponymous group: lead guitarist Rocky Athas, returning bassist Greg Rzab, and new drummer Jay Davenport. This lineup remained unchanged until September 2016, when Athas left Mayall's band due to the frontman's desire to revert to performing as a trio. This format yielded only one album, however – the 2018 live release Three for the Road – before Carolyn Wonderland joined in April 2018 as the band's new lead guitarist.

Members

Current

Former

Timeline

Lineups

Footnotes

Bibliography

References

External links
John Mayall official website

Mayall, John